Olu Omagboye was the 12th Olu of Warri who ruled over the Kingdom of Warri. He succeeded his father, Olu Akenjoye as the 12th Olu of Warri. He took the title, Ogiame Omagboye. His son Olu Akengboye succeeded him.

References

Nigerian traditional rulers
People from Warri
Year of birth unknown
Year of death unknown